The Macedonian Youth Secret Revolutionary Organization or MYSRO, was the name of a secret pro-Bulgarian youth organization established by the Internal Macedonian Revolutionary Organization, active across the most regions of Macedonia between 1922 and 1941. The statue of MYSRO was approved personally from the leader of the Internal Macedonian Revolutionary Organization (IMRO), Todor Alexandrov. The aim of MYSRO was in concordance with the statue of IMRO – unification of all of Macedonia in an autonomous unit within Greater Bulgaria.

It was established in 1921–1922 in Zagreb by students from Vardar Macedonia, it soon gained influence amongst Macedonian Bulgarian communities in Belgrade, Vienna, Graz, Prague, Ljubljana and other places where Macedonian students lived.

In a short time its influence had spread amongst the student youth in Yugoslav and Greek Macedonia and across Europe.

After the Skopje Student Trial of MYSRO followers, the local intelligentsia devolved the organizational structure even further. In Greece, the government exiled scores of suspected members to the Aegean Islands. When in 1941 the Yugoslav and Greek rulers were replaced by Bulgarian administration, the organization became marginalized, and ultimately dissolved.

See also

 Secret society

Notes

References
 Балканските държави и македонския въпрос, Антони Гиза (превод от полски - Димитър Димитров, Македонски Научен Институт  София, 2001)

Bulgarian revolutionary organisations
Internal Macedonian Revolutionary Organization
1920s in Bulgaria
1930s in Bulgaria
Political history of Bulgaria
Modern history of Macedonia (region)
Yugoslav Macedonia

Youth organizations established in 1921
Secret societies in Bulgaria
Defunct organizations based in Bulgaria
Vardar Macedonia (1918–1941)
Bulgarian nationalism
1921 establishments in Yugoslavia
Organizations disestablished in 1941